Ataxia yucatana is a species of beetle in the family Cerambycidae. It was described by Stephan von Breuning in 1940. It is known from Mexico.

References

Ataxia (beetle)
Beetles described in 1940